The 1978 World Men's Handball Championship was the ninth team handball World Championship. It was held in Denmark between 26 January-5 February 1978. West Germany won the championship.

Teams

Preliminary round

Group A

Group B

Group C

Group D

Second round

Group 1

Group 2

Placement matches --  9th to 12th

7th / 8th place 

 (1) -  In Copenhagen

5th / 6th place 

 (1) -  In Copenhagen

3rd / 4th place 

 (1) -  In Copenhagen

Final 

 (1) -  In Copenhagen

Final standings 

Source: International Handball Federation

World Handball Championship tournaments
World Mens Handball Championship, 1978
H
World Mens Handball Championship, 1978
January 1978 sports events in Europe
February 1978 sports events in Europe